Metarranthis hypochraria, the common metarranthis moth, is a moth of the  family Geometridae. It is found in eastern North America.

The larvae feed on various trees and shrubs, but especially Prunus species. They are stick mimics. The larvae can be found from June to July in one generation per year.

References

Moths described in 1854
Hypochrosini